The black-billed barbet (Lybius guifsobalito) is a species of bird in the Lybiidae family.

Distribution
This species has an extremely large range in the Afrotropical realm.  It is present in Cameroon, northeastern Democratic Republic of the Congo, Eritrea, from eastern Sudan to western Ethiopia, western Kenya, northern Tanzania, and Uganda.

Habitat

These birds occur at altitudes between 900 and 2,200 meters above sea level, in open forests, forest edges, woodland vegetation, savannah, scrubs,  gardens and cultivated areas with fruit-bearing trees.

Description
The tail length is between 4.5 and 5.4 centimeters. The beak reaches a length between 1.9 and 2.2 centimeters. Females have similar body measurements, without noticeable sexual dimorphism.  

Males and femalesof these  medium-sized barbets are glossy blue-black, the wings and the belly are a little more brown. They also have a bright red or red-orange face, throat and upper chest. The upperwing are narrowly lined with yellow to white. The beak is rather strong and black, the featherless skin of the face is gray, the eyes are reddish brown. The legs and feet are blackish gray. Young birds have duller plumage than the adult ones. 

It is closely related to Lybius torquatus and Lybius rubrifacies.

Biology
Lybius guifsobalito is an adaptable species . The diet of these birds consists mainly of fruits such as figs, guavas, papaya and various berries. They also eat insects such as beetles, ants, and termites. They usually live in pairs or small groups, up to seven individuals.  The vocalization comprehends a low growling and a series of two-syllabled “koop-pup” phrases.

References 
 This article has been expanded using, inter alia, material based on a translation of an article from the Deutsch Wikipedia, by the same name.

black-billed barbet
Birds of Sub-Saharan Africa
black-billed barbet
Taxonomy articles created by Polbot